Howrah Maidan Metro Station is a station of the Kolkata Metro Line 2 in Howrah Maidan, Howrah, India.  The underground station is located near the Howrah Municipal Corporation Stadium and the Howrah Sarat Sadan. It is the terminus of Line 2 of the Kolkata Metro.

See also
List of Kolkata Metro stations
Transport in Kolkata

References

External links

Official Website for line 2
 UrbanRail.Net – descriptions of all metro systems in the world, each with a schematic map showing all stations.

Kolkata Metro stations
Railway stations in Kolkata